250 Steps is a 2017 Serbian documentary film which details how the Yugoslavia men's national under-19 basketball team won the 1987 FIBA Under-19 World Championship in Bormio, Italy. Created by Vladimir Pajić, the film was released on 25 September 2017 in Belgrade, Serbia.

Cast 
 Svetislav Pešić, a head coach
 Zoran Kalpić, a roster member
 Luka Pavićević, a roster member
 Nebojša Ilić, a roster member
 Toni Kukoč, a roster member
 Miroslav Pecarski, a roster member
 Teoman Alibegović, a roster member
 Aleksandar Đorđević, a roster member and the team captain 
 Samir Avdić, a roster member
 Vlade Divac, a roster member
 Radenko Dobraš, a roster member
 Dino Rađa, a roster member
 Slaviša Koprivica, a roster member
 Marko Pešić, son of Svetislav Pešić. He was 11 at that time.
 Milivoje Karalejić, strength and conditioning coach
 Ljubiša Dmitrović

Release 
On 30 October 2019, the film was released on its YouTube channel.

References

External links
 
 

2017 films
2017 documentary films
Documentary films about basketball
Documentary films about Yugoslavia
Serbian documentary films
2010s Serbian-language films
Cultural depictions of Vlade Divac
Cultural depictions of Yugoslav people
Cultural depictions of Serbian men
Cultural depictions of Croatian men
Cultural depictions of Bosnia and Herzegovina men